The 2013 U-12 Baseball World Cup was an under-12 international baseball tournament held from July 18 to July 28, 2013 in Taipei City, Taiwan.

Round 1

Group A

 Chinese Taipei is the official IBAF designation for the team representing the state officially referred to as the Republic of China, more commonly known as Taiwan. (See also political status of Taiwan for details.)

Group B

Round 2

Final standings

See also
 List of sporting events in Taiwan

References

External links
2013 12U Baseball World Cup Official Website From IBAF 

U-12 Baseball World Cup
U-12 Baseball World Cup
2013
U-12 Baseball World Cup
U-12 Baseball World Cup
U-12 Baseball World Cup
2010s in Taipei
Sports competitions in Taipei